Gaelic football was featured in the Summer Olympic Games unofficial programme in 1904. At least one match was played between Fenians of Chicago, Illinois and Innisfails of host city St. Louis, Missouri. Fenians and Innisfails faced each other on 20 July 1904 and Fenians won 10-0. Innisfails' hurling team also featured in and won the hurling competition.

Final

References

1904 in Gaelic football
Gaelic football
Gaelic football
Gaelic football competitions in the United States
Gaelic football in Missouri
Men's events at the 1904 Summer Olympics